Jan Kjell Larsen (born 24 June 1983 in Haugesund) is a Norwegian former football goalkeeper.

Career statistics

References 
  Player profile on official club website
  National caps

1983 births
Living people
People from Haugesund
People from Karmøy
Association football goalkeepers
Norwegian footballers
Norway under-21 international footballers
FK Haugesund players
Molde FK players
Stabæk Fotball players
Norwegian First Division players
Eliteserien players
Sportspeople from Rogaland